Notiomaso is a genus of South American dwarf spiders that was first described by Nathan Banks in 1914.

Species
 it contains nine species, found in Argentina and Chile:
Notiomaso australis Banks, 1914 (type) – Falkland Is., South Georgia
Notiomaso barbatus (Tullgren, 1901) – Chile, Argentina, Falkland Is.
Notiomaso christina Lavery & Snazell, 2013 – Falkland Is.
Notiomaso exonychus Miller, 2007 – Chile
Notiomaso flavus (Tambs-Lyche, 1954) – Falkland Is., South Georgia
Notiomaso grytvikensis (Tambs-Lyche, 1954) – South Georgia
Notiomaso shackletoni Lavery & Snazell, 2013 – Falkland Is.
Notiomaso spei Lavery & Snazell, 2018 – South Georgia
Notiomaso striatus (Usher, 1983) – Falkland Is.

See also
 List of Linyphiidae species (I–P)

References

Araneomorphae genera
Linyphiidae
Spiders of Georgia (country)
Spiders of South America
Taxa named by Nathan Banks